Fedeleşoiu may refer to several villages in Romania:

 Fedeleşoiu, a village in Ciomăgești Commune, Argeș County
 Fedeleşoiu, a village in Dăești Commune, Vâlcea County